The 1931 Purdue Boilermakers football team represented Purdue University in the Big Ten Conference (Big Ten) during the 1931 college football season. In their second season under head coach Noble Kizer, the Boilermakers compiled a 9–1 record (5–1 against Big Ten opponents), shut out six of ten opponents, suffered its sole loss to Wisconsin, tied with Michigan for the Big Ten championship, and outscored opponents by a total of 192 to 39. The team was recognized as national co-champion by Parke H. Davis.

End Paul Moss and center Ookie Miller were both recognized as first-team All-Americans. Moss received first-team honors from Liberty magazine, and Miller received the same from the United Press and College Humor magazine. Five Purdue players received honors on the 1931 All-Big Ten Conference football team: Paul Moss from the Associated Press (AP), United Press (UP), and captains' team (CPT); Ookie Miller (AP-2, UP-1); quarterback Paul Pardonner (UP-2); halfback Jim Purvis (CPT); and halfback Fred Hecker (AP-2, UP-2).

Schedule

References

Purdue
Purdue Boilermakers football seasons
Big Ten Conference football champion seasons
Purdue Boilermakers football